

List of countries

Western Europe
Political parties in Europe